Gloucester Green is a square in central Oxford, England, and the site of the city's bus station. It lies between George Street to the south and Beaumont Street to the north. To the west is Worcester Street and to the east is Gloucester Street.

The green was once an open space outside Gloucester College (now Worcester College), after which it was named.  From 1783 to 1915 a fair was held on the green, and from 1835 to 1932 it was the site of the city's cattle market.  In 1935, after the cattle market had been moved, the western half of Gloucester Green became the site of the city's bus station, and the eastern half became a car park.  
In 1987, a major redevelopment of the area began. The eastern half became a square, surrounded by shops, restaurants and residential accommodation.  A new, smaller, bus station was built on the site of the old bus station, and an office block was built between the bus station and Worcester Street. An underground car park was also provided.

Today, the Gloucester Green bus station is the Oxford terminus for long-distance coach services, including services to London, coaches to Heathrow, Gatwick, Luton and Stansted airports, and route X5 to Cambridge. The bus station is too small to accommodate more than a few local bus services.

A food market is held in the square every Wednesday and an antiques market every Thursday.

Gloucester Green is surrounded by Oxford theatres: close by are the Oxford Playhouse and Burton Taylor Studio theatres on Beaumont Street and Gloucester Street, respectively, and the OFS Studio in the Old Fire Station and the New Theatre, both on George Street.

Gallery

References

Bus stations in England
Squares in Oxford
Transport in Oxford
Transport infrastructure completed in 1989